Niquinohomo is a municipality in the Masaya department of Nicaragua.
It is home to the oldest extant church in Nicaragua; Church of Saint Ann (Iglesia de Santa Ana). The city's patron saint, as well as the birthplace of Augusto César Sandino, after whom the Sandinista movement was named.

References

Populated places in Nicaragua
Municipalities of the Masaya Department